Summoning is an Austrian atmospheric black metal band based in Vienna. Since their formation in 1993, they have released eight full-length albums and two EPs via Napalm Records. Their lyrics make extensive use of J.R.R. Tolkien's Middle-earth writings and mythology. Since 1995, their lineup has had a consistent lineup of Richard Lederer as "Protector" and Michael Gregor as "Silenius". The band never played live performances and has consistently maintained that they have no interest in ever doing so. Their latest album With Doom We Come was released on 5 January 2018.

History

Early years (1993–1995) 
Summoning was formed in 1993 by Silenius (Michael Gregor), Protector (Richard Lederer) and Trifixion (Alexander Trondl). Before forming Summoning, Protector was a drummer in a thrash/death metal band Marlignom and had embarked on a four-year study of drums in music school. At the age of 16, Silenius was in a doom metal band Shadow Vale and studied piano for a few years in music school. He also played in a band Cromm together with Pazuzu (Ray Wells). Trifixion was a member of Pervertum.

Summoning recorded two demos (Upon the Viking's Stallion and Anno Mortiri Domini), as well as a split with the Austrian band Pazuzu (The Urilia Text) and a five-track promo tape for Lugburz. Nearly all of the demo songs were never released or were recomposed for future albums.

The demos sold quite well in a record shop in Vienna called "Why not". Silenius got in contact with Thomas Tannenberger, eventually leading to the foundation of Abigor. Silenius ended up doing vocals for all Abigor releases (except the demos) as a permanent member until 1999. The first Abigor album was recorded for the Napalm Records label, which led to Silenius managing to get a deal with Napalm for Summoning's debut Lugburz album in 1995. At that time the members of Summoning were: Silenius (vocals, keyboards, bass), Protector (vocals, keyboards, guitar), Trifixion (drums); Pazuzu did additional vocals and wrote some of the lyrics. It was Trifixion's last release with Summoning. Lugburz was a traditional black metal, vastly different than the band's future releases.

Active years (1995–2003) 
The band continued as a duo after the departure of Trifixion, releasing Minas Morgul in 1995. This was the band's first release set in an epic and atmospheric style utilizing guitar purely as a background instrument and synth almost as a lead, using re-recorded early songs.  Dol Guldur, released in 1997, continued this style, influenced by Protector's dark wave project Ice Ages. It also credits J.R.R. Tolkien for the lyrics. Later in 1997, the Nightshade Forests EP was released. Following this, the band ceased all work for nearly two years, and also stopped work with many of their other music projects. But in 1999, Summoning returned with Stronghold, which, while still in the classic Summoning style, focused more on guitar work to create melodic lines rather than keyboards and synthesizers like in previous releases.

In 2001, the follow-up Let Mortal Heroes Sing Your Fame album was released. This release was a combination between the old and new style of Summoning, with the keyboard lines being more epic and polyphonic while the guitars bore a similarity with the more complex and rock-esque guitar-style featured on Stronghold. This time, the band used more spoken-word samples to bring a more dramatic style to the songs and for the first time the band worked with clear vocal choirs on the song "Farewell". The lyrical concept again was totally based on Tolkien's Middle-earth, but for the first time it was combined with some inspiration from Michael Moorcock's fantasy writings. In 2003, they released the Lost Tales EP, which consisted of leftovers from the Dol Guldur sessions.

Oath Bound and inactivity (2006–2011) 
2006 saw the release of Oath Bound, which consisted of entirely new material. The five year long break between the releases of Let Mortal Heroes Sing Your Fame and Oath Bound was due to struggles in the band members' personal lives, along with lack of ideas. Oath Bound featured a "relaxed arpeggio style" guitar sound, which gave a more epic feeling to the sound of the album. The band also had higher-quality equipment available to them for the recording of the album and were able to create greater choir vocals than they had done before. A 4-song mini CD was suggested for release in 2007 containing at least one song which did not make it onto Oath Bound due to size issues, however, this idea was abandoned and Protector instead began work on music for a full-length release while waiting for Silenius to finish recording the next Kreuzweg Ost album.

Following the release of Oath Bound, Summoning entered a period of inactivity. Silenius experienced a creative block and lacked inspiration for creating new music for Summoning. He also suffered a heart attack. In an interview for IsolationGrind, he is quoted saying: "a heart-infarct knocked me out for another half a year, but somehow all this brought me to a point where I got hungry again and since then I concentrated again on making riffs. Everything started in small steps. but after a while I knew in which direction the music was going and the more I knew this, the easier it was to compose and the result is what you hear now."

Old Mornings Dawn (2012–2017) 
In February 2012, the band announced on their website that they were in the process of writing new songs, and hoped to have most of the songs complete by the end of the year. In December 2012 it was announced that all the guitars and Protector's vocal parts for the new album were complete and that the upcoming album would be entitled Old Mornings Dawn. The album was released in June 2013 via Napalm Records and lyrically focused mostly on nature themes, as well as J.R.R. Tolkien's Valinor.

In 2015 the band confirmed that they had already begun working on creating a new album, and were focused on rewriting some of the leftover material from Old Mornings Dawn.

On 15 December 2016, a compilation tribute album titled In Mordor Where The Shadows Are - Homage to Summoning was released by Wolfspell Records. The album features covers of 21 different Summoning songs by artists such as Caladan Brood and Emyn Muil.

With Doom We Come (2018) 
On 12 August 2017, Summoning posted an update on their official Facebook page noting that despite troubles, setbacks and disputes, the band's new album will be released in January 2018 by Napalm Records. The band posted a teaser of the new music, although they did not disclose the name of the forthcoming album.

On 1 October 2017, Summoning posted an update on their Facebook page announcing the title of the album as With Doom We Come. The album was subsequently released on 5 January 2018.

Musical style and influences
The band's debut album Lugburz was a traditional black metal album, with a raw, lo-fi production style. On their following album Minas Morgul the band's sound changed significantly, and has been characterised as "a departure from straight black metal in favor of bold atmospheric experimentation which retains a definite blackened feel." The band's sound has remained relatively consistent since then. It was frequently described as "epic", "hypnotic", and "atmospheric", and makes extensive use of keyboards, choir vocals, clean singing, synthesized instruments, and programmed drums. Though the drums are programmed, they are played using a keyboard rather than with a drum machine. Their sound has been described as "a particularly widescreen version of progressive black metal, a style that more recently has been infused with an almost medieval strain of twiddly folk music of the lutes 'n' flutes variety." The band's music is deeply influenced by the literature of J. R. R. Tolkien, particularly The Lord of the Rings. Most of the band's lyrics are derived from Tolkien's own works. Silenius claimed to be influenced by dark wave and ritualistic music as well as fantasy literature.

The band stated that they consider themselves to be composers rather than musicians and do not practice together before recording. Guitarist Protector does not own a guitar and has used a different borrowed guitar for every recording since Dol Guldur.

Discography

Studio albums
 Lugburz (1995)
 Minas Morgul (1995)
 Dol Guldur (1997)
 Stronghold (1999)
 Let Mortal Heroes Sing Your Fame (2001)
 Oath Bound (2006)
 Old Mornings Dawn (2013)
 With Doom We Come (2018)

EPs
 Nightshade Forests (1997)
 Lost Tales (2003)

Singles
 "With Doom I Come" (2017)

Compilation albums
 Sounds of Middle-Earth (2007)

Split albums
 The Urilia Text (1994, with Pazuzu)
 Creation of a Dark Age (1994, with Abigor, Pazuzu and Cromm)

Demos
 Upon the Viking Stallion (1993)
 Anno Mortiri Domini (1994)
 Promo Tape (1994)

Members

Current members 
 Protector – guitars, vocals, keyboards
 Silenius – bass, vocals, keyboards

Past members 
 Trifixion – drums, vocals (1993-1995)
 Pazuzu – vocals (1993-1995)

Related bands
Protector (Richard Lederer) is engaged in other projects
 Die Verbannten Kinder Evas: Dark wave project
 Ice Ages: A melodic kind of EBM

Silenius (Michael Gregor) is the creator and sole member of Kreuzweg Ost. Silenius also served as the vocalist for the Austrian black metal band Abigor between 1994 and 1999. Silenius is also an active member in Amestigon, a pagan black metal band, as well as Shadow Vale, and Mirkwood, both of which are darkwave ambient projects.

References

External links
 Official website (defunct)
 Summoning at Napalm Records
 Summoning at Metal-Archives
 Summoning Interview in Horror Garage

 
Austrian heavy metal musical groups
Symphonic black metal musical groups
Austrian black metal musical groups
Music based on Middle-earth
Musical groups established in 1993
Napalm Records artists
Heavy metal duos